Efes may refer to:

 Anadolu Efes S.K., a Turkish basketball club
 Efes Beverage Group, a Turkish beer company
 Efes Daromi, third-century Talmudic scholar
 Ephesus, an ancient Greek city sited in modern-day Turkey

See also
 Efe (disambiguation)